Alexander Gregg (October 8, 1819 - July 11, 1893), an Episcopal clergyman, was the first bishop of Texas.

Early life and education
Alexander Gregg was born on October 8, 1819, in Society Hill, South Carolina, Darlington County, South Carolina, in an area historically known as ″the old Cheraws", the son of David Gregg and Athalinda Brocky. He was educated at the academy at Winnsboro, South Carolina, after which he attended the South Carolina College from where he graduated with a Bachelor of Arts in December 1838. He married Charlotte Wilson Kollock on April 21, 1841, and together had ten children. He was then admitted to practice law as an attorney in Cheraw, South Carolina on December 6, 1841, and practiced law there for two years. Gregg became interested in the Episcopal Church and was eventually baptized and confirmed in 1843 at St David's Church.

Ordained ministry
After his baptism and confirmation, Gregg became a candidate for holy orders. He was ordained deacon on  June 10, 1846, and priest on December 19, 1847 at St Philip's Church by Bishop Christopher Edwards Gadsden of South Carolina. He spent his whole ministry, just before his election as bishop, as the rector of St David's Church in Cheraw, South Carolina.

Episcopacy
Gregg was the first elected bishop of Texas on May 5, 1859 and was consecrated on October 13, 1859 by Presiding Bishop John Henry Hopkins. His diocese covered the entire state of Texas. Bishop Gregg presided through the difficult days of the Civil War and Reconstruction, and gave leadership as Texas changed from frontier to settled community. He saw the number of churches in his diocese grow from six to sixty. In 1874, toward the end of his episcopate, Gregg presided over the division of the Diocese of Texas into three dioceses - two new missionary districts of West Texas and North Texas. The Diocese of Texas retained the name of the original diocese in its present boundaries. He was also the fourth Chancellor of the University of the South, serving from August 1, 1887, until his death.

Literary work
In 1867, Bishop Gregg published "History of the Old Cheraws", the history of his native area with a decided emphasis on the Patriot role in the American Revolution.

Death
Bishop Gregg died in office at his Austin, Texas, home on July 10, 1893, is buried at Saint David's Church in Cheraw, South Carolina.

See also
Episcopal Church in the United States of America
Episcopal Diocese of Texas

References

External links
 Bishop Alexander Gregg (1819-1893) Find a Grave Memorial, Saint David's Episcopal Church Cemetery, Cheraw, Chesterfield County, South Carolina
Old Saint Davids Episcopal Church Cemetery 
Alexander Gregg, First Bishop of Texas by His Son, the Late Wilson Gregg online biography (1912)
1905 Reprint of Bishop Gregg's History of the Old Cheraws with additional material as an appendix. (Google Books pdf)

1819 births
1893 deaths
Burials in South Carolina
Historians of the American Revolution
People from Society Hill, South Carolina
19th-century Anglican bishops in the United States
People from Austin, Texas
Episcopal bishops of Texas